Football clubs representing the five main islands of the Indonesian archipelago contested the 2010–2011 season of the Indonesian Super League at the Djarum Inter Islands Cup football tournament.

The six clubs participating in the tournament held between 27 August – 5 September by PT Liga Indonesia were divided into two groups.

Teams in Group A – consisting of Sumatra's Sriwijaya FC, Kalimantan's Balikpapan FC, Persib Bandung (Java) – competed at Jakabaring Stadium in Palembang, South Sumatra, while, Group B's PSM (Sulawesi), Arema FC Indonesia (Java), and Persiwa Wamena (Papua) competed in Malang, East Java.

The final of the tournament took place in Palembang on 5 September, when Sriwijaya FC won by 2–0 over Persiwa Wamena.

Group stage
Winners of each group will qualify for the final.

Group A
All matches were played in Malang Regency on 27 – 31 August 2010.
Times listed are UTC+7.
<onlyinclude>

Group B
All matches were played in Palembang City on 27 August – 1 September 2010.
Times listed are UTC+7.
<onlyinclude>

Final

Goalscorers
4 goals
  Sriwijaya FC

2 goals

  Sriwijaya FC
  Balikpapan FC
  Sriwijaya FC

1 goal

  Wamena FC
  Wamena FC
  Wamena FC
  Arema FC
  Balikpapan FC
  Makassar FC
  Bandung FC
  Wamena FC
  Wamena FC
  Arema FC
  Balikpapan FC
  Makassar FC
  Bandung FC

Own goals

  Balikpapan FC (playing against Bandung FC)
  Bandung FC (playing against Balikpapan FC)

References

Indonesian Inter Island Cup tournaments
Inter